Travis James Ackerman (born August 20, 1975) is a former Canadian football offensive tackle. Ackerman played in five games for the Toronto Argonauts of the Canadian Football League over the 1999 season, and is the younger brother of former National Football League offensive lineman Tom Ackerman.

Early life
Ackerman was a three-year varsity starter on both the offensive and defensive line before graduating from Nooksack Valley High School in 1994. After his senior season he was named Whatcom County League Offensive Player of the Year, and was also named AP All-State 1st Team on both sides of the ball. He also was a four-year letter winner in basketball as a center.

Personal life
T.J. is currently a real estate agent as well as the offensive coordinator for the Nooksack Valley Pioneers football team, and has been an assistant coach since 2000. He was also the special guest on episode 49 of the highly popular Whatcom County Football Podcast.

References 

Players of American football from Washington (state)
American football offensive tackles
Canadian football offensive linemen
Eastern Washington Eagles football players
Toronto Argonauts players
Sportspeople from Bellingham, Washington
Living people
1975 births
Players of Canadian football from Washington (state)